The Ron Clark Story (also known as The Triumph) is a 2006 television film starring Matthew Perry. The film is based on the real-life educator Ron Clark. It follows the tale of an idealistic teacher who leaves his small hometown to teach in a New York City public school, where he faces trouble with the students. The film was directed by Randa Haines, and was released directly on television. The film premiered on TNT on August 13, 2006.

Plot

In 1998, Ron Clark leaves his teaching at an elementary school in his North Carolina hometown, where he is known for his innovative teaching methods which results in raising test scores. He decides to look for a teaching job in a tough New York inner city school where he feels he could be more useful. He finds a job at Inner Harlem Elementary School, where the students are sorted according to their potential.

The principal of the school believes Clark may be too "nice-looking," to take on the rough, disruptive students in a 6th grade class that has just been abandoned by their teacher. He offers Clark a third-grade class, but Clark insists on taking the older kids that nobody else wants. He quickly learns that it will be a battle of wills between himself and his students to see who can outlast the other. He struggles to understand them, both individually and collectively, before he can teach them the standardized materials.

Cast
 Matthew Perry as Ron Clark
 Melissa De Sousa as Marissa Vega
 Patricia Idlette as Devina
 Ernie Hudson as Principal Turner
 Brandon Mychal Smith as Tayshawn Mitchell
 Hannah Hodson as Shameika Wallace
 Micah Stephen Williams as Julio Vasquez
Jerry Callaghan as Ron Clark, Sr.
Marty Antonini as Howard
Patricia Benedict as Jean Clark

Reception

Accolades

References

External links

The Ron Clark Story on Rotten Tomatoes
Official website

2006 television films
2006 films
TNT Network original films
2006 biographical drama films
American biographical drama films
Biographical films about educators
Films set in the 1990s
Films set in 1994
Films set in 1998
Films set in 1999
Films directed by Randa Haines
Cultural depictions of American men
Cultural depictions of educators
2006 drama films
2000s American films